The Clearwater Cave System in Gunung Mulu National Park, Sarawak, Malaysia is believed to be one of the largest interconnected cave systems in the world by volume and the 9th longest cave in the world at  (2020). The system lies mainly under the western margins of Gunung Api between the Melinau Gorge and Cave of the Winds.

The first exploration by speleologists was during the 1977/78 Royal Geographical Society Mulu Sarawak Expedition when  of the cave passage were surveyed. Many expeditions by the Mulu Caves Project have increased the explored length and will continue to do so for the foreseeable future.

See also
List of longest caves

References

Gill.D.W.1999. World Heritage Nomination, Gunung Mulu National Park, Sarawak, Malaysia. Forest Department Sarawak.

Sources
 Mulu Caves, Brook and Waltham (1979), Royal Geographical Society
 Caves of Mulu '80, (1981), Eavis, Royal Geographical Society
 Caves of Mulu '84, (1985), Eavis, British Cave Research Association
 Mulu Caves '88 and '89 Expeditions, (1989), Kirby, Mulu Caves Project
 Mulu Caves '91 (1991), Kirby, Mulu Caves Project

External links

Caves of Sarawak